Charles Shaw may refer to:
Charles F. Shaw, founder of the Charles Shaw wine brand
Charles B. Shaw, engineer responsible for the Northwestern Turnpike
Charles Green Shaw (1892–1974), American painter and writer
Charles Shaw (writer) (1900–1955), Australian novelist whose book Heaven Knows, Mr. Allison was adapted for film
Charles Alexander Shaw (1944–2020), United States federal judge 
Charles Shaw (singer) (born 1960), rapper who sang vocals credited to Milli Vanilli
Charles Shaw (British Army officer) (1795–1871), British soldier active in Portuguese campaigns
Charles Shaw (journalist) (1911–1987), American journalist
Charles "Bobo" Shaw (1947–2017), American jazz drummer
Charlie Shaw (footballer, born 1862) (1862–?), English footballer
Charlie Shaw (footballer, born 1885) (1885–1938), Scottish football goalkeeper (Celtic FC)
Charles Shaw (potter) (1832–1906), English potter
Charles Thurstan Shaw (1914–2013), English archaeologist
Charles A. Shaw (1831–1909), New England politician, inventor, and showman
Allan Shaw (priest) (Charles Allan Shaw, 1927–1989), Anglican priest
Barry Shaw (barrister) (Charles Barry Shaw, 1923–2010), Northern Irish barrister
C. Montague Shaw (Charles Montague Shaw, 1882–1968), Australian actor
Sir Charles Shaw, 1st Baronet (1859–1942), British Liberal Party politician

See also
Charles Shaw wine, a brand of "extreme value" wine